Delta8-fatty-acid desaturase (Delta8-sphingolipid desaturase, EFD1, BoDES8, SLD, Delta8 fatty acid desaturase, Delta8-desaturase) is an enzyme with systematic name phytosphinganine,hydrogen donor:oxygen Delta8-oxidoreductase. This enzyme catalyses the following chemical reaction

 phytosphinganine + reduced acceptor + O2  Delta8-phytosphingenine + acceptor + 2 H2O

This enzyme, which has been found mainly in plants, introduces a double bond at Delta8 of C18 and C20 fatty acids.

References

External links 
 

EC 1.14.19